November 16 - Eastern Orthodox liturgical calendar - November 18

All fixed commemorations below are observed on November 30 by Orthodox Churches on the Old Calendar.

For November 17, Orthodox Churches on the Old Calendar commemorate the Saints listed on November 4.

Saints

 Saint Gregory the Wonderworker of Neo-Caesarea (266)
 Hieromartyr Basil, Bishop of Hamah (282)
 Martyrs Zachariah the Cobbler and his wife, Mary (3rd century) 
 Martyrs Gregory, Victor, and Geminus of Heracleon in Thrace (304)
 150 philosophers converted by St. Catherine, and who suffered in Alexandria (305)
 Venerable Longinus of Egypt (4th century)
 Martyr Sak (Saktus, Sanctus) the Persian.
 Saints Maximian of Constantinople (434) and Gennadius of Constantinople (471), Patriarchs of Constantinople.  (see also: April 21 )
 Saint John the Cobbler of Olumba, Cairo, and Sinai (7th century)
 Venerable Lazarus the iconographer of Constantinople (857)
 Great-Martyr Gobron (Michael) and 133 soldiers of Georgia (914)
 Venerable John of Olympus (John Dermokaitis), in Bithynia (c. 919-944)
 Venerable Justin.

Pre-Schism Western saints

 Martyrs Acisclus and Victoria, at Córdoba in Hispania (304)
 Saint Eugene, a deacon of the Church of Florence with Bishop Zenobius (422)
 Saint Anianus of Orleans (Aignan), fifth Bishop of Orleans in France (453)
 Saint Gregory of Tours, Bishop of Tours (594), and with him Venerable Aredius, Abbot of Limoges and Venerable Vulfolaic, stylite of Trier, Gaul.
 Saint Namasius (Naamat, Namat, Namatius), twenty-second Bishop of Vienne in France (c. 599)
 Venerable Hilda, Abbess of Whitby Abbey (680)

Post-Schism Orthodox saints

 Venerable Gennadius, Abbot of Vatopedi, Mount Athos (14th century)
 Venerable Nikon, Abbot of Radonezh, disciple of St. Sergius of Radonezh (1426)
 Venerable Archimandrite Sebastian (Dabovich) of San Francisco and Jackson, Enlightener and Apostle of the Church in America (1940)

Other commemorations
 Translation of the relics (1935) of St. Gregory, Bishop of Assos near Ephesus (1150), to Lesvos. (On the Sunday between November 11–17 each year.)

Icon gallery

Notes

References

Sources
 November 17 / December 30. Orthodox Calendar (PRAVOSLAVIE.RU).
 November 30 / November 17. Holy Trinity Russian Orthodox Church (A parish of the Patriarchate of Moscow).
 November 17. OCA - The Lives of the Saints.
 The Autonomous Orthodox Metropolia of Western Europe and the Americas (ROCOR). St. Hilarion Calendar of Saints for the year of our Lord 2004. St. Hilarion Press (Austin, TX). p. 86.
 The Seventeenth Day of the Month of November. Orthodoxy in China.
 November 17. Latin Saints of the Orthodox Patriarchate of Rome.
 The Roman Martyrology. Transl. by the Archbishop of Baltimore. Last Edition, According to the Copy Printed at Rome in 1914. Revised Edition, with the Imprimatur of His Eminence Cardinal Gibbons. Baltimore: John Murphy Company, 1916. p. 354-355.
 Rev. Richard Stanton. A Menology of England and Wales, or, Brief Memorials of the Ancient British and English Saints Arranged According to the Calendar, Together with the Martyrs of the 16th and 17th Centuries. London: Burns & Oates, 1892. pp. 551–554.
Greek Sources
 Great Synaxaristes:  17 ΝΟΕΜΒΡΙΟΥ. ΜΕΓΑΣ ΣΥΝΑΞΑΡΙΣΤΗΣ.
  Συναξαριστής. 17 Νοεμβρίου. ECCLESIA.GR. (H ΕΚΚΛΗΣΙΑ ΤΗΣ ΕΛΛΑΔΟΣ). 
  17/11/2015. Ορθόδοξος Συναξαριστής. 
Russian Sources
  30 ноября (17 ноября). Православная Энциклопедия под редакцией Патриарха Московского и всея Руси Кирилла (электронная версия). (Orthodox Encyclopedia - Pravenc.ru).
  17 ноября по старому стилю / 30 ноября по новому стилю. Русская Православная Церковь - Православный церковный календарь на 2018 год.

November in the Eastern Orthodox calendar